Matt Smith (born 31 October 1972) is a British editor and author. He is the current and longest-serving editor of the long-running British science fiction weekly comics anthology magazine 2000 AD and its sister title the Judge Dredd Megazine

Career
Smith joined 2000 AD in 2000, after three years working as a desk editor for MacMillan, at the time the comic was changing ownership – from Egmont to Rebellion Developments. Starting out as the assistant to the new editor Andy Diggle, Smith was appointed as the ninth incarnation of Tharg the Mighty (a humorous character representing the 2000 AD editor) in January 2002.

After Alan Barnes resigned from the Judge Dredd Megazine, Smith also took over the editorship thereof in 2006.

Since 2005 Smith has also branched out into writing: his credits so far include a Judge Dredd novel and three novellas, along with three more novellas for one of that series' many spinoffs, and regular stints on the syndicated Judge Dredd newspaper strips.

Bibliography

Editing
Comics edited include:
2000 AD #1274 – ongoing, January 2002 – present
Judge Dredd Megazine #241 – ongoing, February 2006 – present

Writing

Narrative prose
Judge Dredd: The Final Cut (Black Flame, February 2005)
Tomes of the Dead: The Words of Their Roaring (Abaddon Books, May 2007)
Judge Dredd Year One: City Fathers (Abaddon Books (e-book), August 2012)
Strontium Dog: Among the Missing (Abaddon Books (e-book), October 2013)
 Judge Dredd Year Two: Down and Out (Abaddon Books (e-book), September 2016)
The Fall of Deadworld: A trilogy of novellas set in an grimmer alternative version of the Judge Dredd setting shortly before its destruction at the hands of the Dark Judges. The prose stories by Smith act as an extended prelude to the main Fall of Deadworld comic series, created for 2000 AD by writer Nigel "Kek-W" Long and artist Dave Kendall.
Red Mosquito (Abaddon Books, 2019)
Bone White Seeds (Abaddon Books, 2020)
Grey Flesh Flies (Abaddon Books, 2020)
An omnibus containing all three novellas was published in June 2020.
Zenith: "Permission to Land" (credited as Martin Howe), short story in 2000 AD #2050, 2017
Judge Dredd Year Three: Machineries of Hate (Abaddon Books (e-book), 2020)

Comics

Dredd: "Top of the World, Ma-Ma" in Judge Dredd Megazine #328, 2012
Judge Dredd: Year One #1–4, IDW Publishing, 2013
Judge Dredd:
"The Jimps Club" in 2000 AD Free Comic Book Day issue, 2013
"The Badge" in 2000 AD FCBD 2014
"In Through the Out Door" in 2000 AD FCBD, 2015
"Forty Years of Hurt" in 2000 AD FCBD, 2017
Cadet Dredd:
"Crowd Control" in 2000 AD FCBD, 2018
"Combat Ready" in 2000 AD #2183, 2020

Reviews
Nemesis the Warlock: A Monograph (supplement with Judge Dredd Megazine #395, May 2018)

Awards
2007: Won the "Favourite Editor" Eagle Award
2008: Won the "Favourite Editor" Eagle Award
2010: Nominated for the "Favourite Editor" Eagle Award
2011: Won the "Favourite Editor" Eagle Award
2012: Nominated for the "Favourite Editor" Eagle Award

Notes

References

Matt Smith at 2000ad.org

Bishop, David Thrill Power Overload (Rebellion Developments, 260 pages, February 2007)

External links

2003 Interview with 411
2004 Interview with 2000ADReview
2007 Interview with 2000ADReview
2007 interview about 2000 AD's 30th anniversary, Comics Bulletin

1972 births
21st-century British novelists
Living people
British male novelists
Comic book editors
21st-century British male writers